My Past Is My Own is a television film which aired as a CBS Schoolbreak Special on January 24, 1989.  The film is centered on a sit-in in the early 1960s at a racially segregated lunch counter in the Southern United States. Whoopi Goldberg, Phill Lewis and Allison Dean portray the lead characters.

Writer/producer Alan Gansberg was awarded the 1989 Humanitas Prize in the Children's Live-Action Category for his work on My Past Is My Own. Editor Jayme Wing was nominated for an Emmy for best achievement in film editing.

Plot 
Justin Cook (Phill Lewis) and his sister Kerry (Allison Dean) are two African American teenagers living in a middle-class New Jersey household in the late 1980s. The Cook family is visited by their distant cousin, psychologist Mariah Johnston (Whoopi Goldberg).  A contemporary of Justin and Kerry's parents, Mariah is about to receive an award for her years of community work, particularly in the area of civil rights.  Having been born after the Civil Rights Movement, Justin and Kerry never experienced Jim Crow segregation, and the two fail to appreciate the stories about the era that Mariah and their parents recount at dinner.

While Justin and Kerry sleep that night, they are mysteriously transported to a small town in Georgia in 1961. While there, the siblings participate in a sit-in at a segregated lunch counter. The protest is staged by a group of local teenagers and young adults—including their cousin Mariah. The siblings are horrified by the hostility and racism of local White residents, and inspired by the strength displayed by Mariah and the others as the group is harassed during the sit-in.

When they awaken the following morning, the siblings find themselves back in the 1980s.  No one is aware of their journey to the past except Justin and Kerry themselves (and possibly Mariah).  As the Cook family watches Mariah accept her award later that day, Justin and Kerry do so with a greater appreciation for Mariah, the Civil Rights Movement, and the history of African Americans in general.

Cast 

Whoopi Goldberg - Mariah Johnston
Phill Lewis - Justin Cook
Allison Dean - Kerry Cook
C.C.H. Pounder - Renee Cook
Thalmus Rasulala - Marshall Cook
William Allen Young - Rev. James Jordan
Geoffrey Blake - Dexter Lee Smith
Guy Boyd - Russell Crew
Gloria Carlin - Frances Taylor
Kenneth Edwards - Clyde Waller
Dominic Hoffman - Donny Hall
Charles Stransky - Alfred Wainwright
Anthony Grumbach - White Boy
Laurneá Wilkerson - Brianne Solomons
Dorothy Sinclair - White Woman
James Marshall - Willie Willens

Music 
The James Ingram tune "Remember the Dream" serves as the theme song for the movie.

See also
 Civil rights movement in popular culture

Notes

External links
 My Past Is My Own (1989) at The Internet Movie Database

African-American films
Civil rights movement in television
1989 television films
1989 films
American television films
Films about race and ethnicity
Films set in Georgia (U.S. state)
Films set in New Jersey
Films set in the 1960s
Films set in the 1980s
Films about time travel